In mathematics, specifically in the field of group theory, the McKay  conjecture is a conjecture of equality between the number of irreducible complex characters of degree not divisible by a prime number  to that of the normalizer of a Sylow -subgroup.  It is named after Canadian mathematician John McKay.

Statement 
Define

where  denotes the set of complex irreducible characters of the group . The McKay conjecture claims the equality

References 

  (Corrected reprint of the 1976 original, published by Academic Press.)
 

Representation theory of groups